The Gran Casino del Sardinero is a leading gambling casino in the city of Santander in the autonomous community of Cantabria (Spain). It is in the Plaza de Italia in El Sardinero.

History
There had been a casino very popular with royalty in this location, but it was demolished after a fire in the 1890s and the present building erected. It opened in 1916, designed by architect Eloy Martínez del Valle.

Since it opened the casino has combined roulette and baccarat with dancing and staging of plays, musicals and operas. Not because it stopped being the focal point of summer fun, a situation which, however, was a remarkable turn during the post-war. The almost complete closure of their premises, except the theater which was assigned to art cinema and testing, continued until December 1, 1978, when it was reopened as a gambling casino after of the restoration carried out by the architect Ricardo Lorenzo, who kept the neoclassical style with modernist touches.

 it has a game room and a room of slot machines, a restaurant, three dining rooms, two bars, installed in each of the gaming rooms, a café and a party room. It also has a showroom is usually the presence of works of art by various artists. The games played in the game room are roulette of single 0, blackjack, poker without discarding, and slot machines and electronic roulette in the machines room. Currently, has been incorporated the modality of Texas holdem tournament.

The Gran Casino sponsors and organizes various cultural and sporting events (Festival Internacional de Santander), photographic contests, sculpture and painting exhibitions, bowling, football, rowing and other activities.

References

External links
 Official website

Casinos completed in 1916
Buildings and structures in Cantabria
Casinos in Spain
Santander, Spain
Tourist attractions in Cantabria